馬場, meaning "horse field", "hippodrome", or "racecourse", may refer to:

In the Mandarin reading Mǎchǎng:
Machangding, former administrative district in Wanhua District, Taipei, Taiwan

In the Cantonese reading Máhcheùhng:
Racecourse station (MTR), Shatin, New Territories, Hong Kong
Sha Tin Racecourse, New Territories, Hong Kong
Happy Valley Racecourse, Hong Kong Island, Hong Kong

In the Korean reading Majang:
Majang-dong, Seungdong-gu, Seoul, South Korea
Majang station, Seoul Metro station located there

In the Japanese reading Baba:
Takadanobaba, Shinjuku, Tokyo neighbourhood often simply referred to as "Baba"
Takadanobaba Station, railway and metro station located there
Baba (name)

See also
Horse racing
List of horse racing venues